Harvey is a census-designated place (CDP) in Jefferson Parish, Louisiana, United States. Harvey is on the south side (referred to as the "West Bank") of the Mississippi River, within the New Orleans–Metairie–Kenner metropolitan statistical area. The majority-minority population was 20,348 at the 2010 census, down from 22,226 at the 2000 census. The 2020 census determined 22,236 people lived in the CDP.

History
During the French colonial era, the first owner of this land was Jean-Baptiste d'Estrehan de Beaupre, royal treasurer and comptroller for the French Louisiana colony. He established a plantation here. He used his slaves to dig the ditch that would become the Harvey Canal, cutting south from the banks of the Mississippi River to the back of Bayou Barataria, to provide better access.

Years later, d'Estrehan paid German settlers in the area to work on widening the ditch; they used wooden shovels. He paid them with small parcels of land located downriver in Mechanicsham, now the city of Gretna. D'Estrehan built his home where the ditch met the river banks, naming the settlement "Cosmopolite City".

Harvey was founded as a company town at its founding, developed by Joseph Hale Harvey (born March 7, 1816). During this time, Joseph Harvey would rename Cosmopolite City after his family surname. Harvey's wife, née Louise Destrehan, was a great-granddaughter of Jean Baptiste d'Estrehan. She was the daughter of Nicolas Noel d'Estrehan and granddaughter of Jean Noel Destréhan.

Harvey and Destrehan initiated construction of the canal locks leading to the Mississippi. Their son, Horace Harvey (c. 1860-1938), carried on development of the canal and its surroundings.

Geography

Harvey is located east of the Intracoastal Canal on the Mississippi River, at coordinates . It is bordered to the east by Gretna, to the west by Marrero, to the southwest by Woodmere, and to the north, across the Mississippi, by New Orleans.

Demographics

According to the 2020 United States census, there were 22,236 people, 8,119 households, and 4,756 families residing in the CDP. At the 2019 American Community Survey, there were 21,054 people living in the CDP. According to the census of 2010, there were 20,348 people, 7,544 households, and 5,160 families residing in the CDP. 

In 2020, the racial and ethnic makeup of Harvey was 43.65% Black or African American, 29.18% non-Hispanic white, 0.29% Native American, 6.53% Asian, 0.03% Pacific Islander, 3.62% two or more races, and 16.72% Hispanic and Latino American of any race.  The racial and ethnic makeup was 34.2% non-Hispanic white, 51.6% African American, 0.2% Native American, 4.9% Asian, 4.1% some other race, 1.3% two or more races, and 9.5% Hispanic or Latino American of any race in 2019. In 2010, the racial makeup of the CDP was 43.5% White, 41.1% African American, 0.4% Native American, 6.8% Asian, 0.1% Pacific Islander, 5.6% some other race, and 2.5% from two or more races. Hispanic or Latino of any race were 13.4% of the population. From 2010 to 2020, the population and diversification of the CDP has reflected state and nationwide demographic trends of African American, Asian, and Hispanic and Latino growth.

For the period 2012-2016, the median annual income for a household in the CDP was $37,058, and the median income for a family was $52,173. Male full-time workers had a median income of $40,205 versus $32,500 for females. The per capita income for the CDP was $22,344. About 17.4% of families and 21.5% of the population were below the poverty line, including 29.4% of those under age 18 and 19.4% of those age 65 or over. By 2019, the median household income was $41,559 and 16.6% of the population lived at or below the poverty line.

Government and infrastructure
The Louisiana Office of Juvenile Justice operates the New Orleans Metro Office in Harvey.

The United States Postal Service operates the Harvey Post Office.

Education

Harvey's public schools are operated by the Jefferson Parish Public School System, which has its headquarters in Harvey.

Public high schools:
Helen Cox High School
West Jefferson High School

Some residents are zoned to Gretna Middle School in Gretna, and some are zoned to Marrero Middle School in Marrero.

Woodland West Elementary School is in Harvey. Ella C. Pittman Elementary School is in Marrero, adjacent to Harvey and serving portions of Harvey. Other schools outside of Harvey serving portions: Gretna Park and McDonogh #26 in Gretna, Cox Elementary in Timberlane, Collins Elementary (formerly Ames) in Marrero. Woodmere Elementary in Woodmere is nearby, but its attendance zone does not cover the Harvey CDP.

Public kindergartens:
Harvey Kindergarten Center

In regards to advanced studies academies, residents are zoned to the Gretna Academy.

Previously Homedale Elementary in Harvey served portions of the city. In 2012 Homedale Elementary closed. A plan called for Homedale students to be rezoned to McDonogh 26 Elementary in Gretna.

Private schools
St. Ville Academy for High School Preparation
Homedale School
St Rosalie Elementary School

Jefferson Parish Library operates the Jane O'Brien Chatelain West Bank Regional Library in Harvey. The  facility opened in 1990 and is the largest public library in the West Bank of Jefferson Parish.

Notable people

Zaila Avant-garde, winner of the 2021 Scripps National Spelling Bee
Ja'Marr Chase, wide receiver in the NFL. Currently playing for the Cincinnati Bengals.
Patrick Connick, the District 84 Republican state representative, practices law in Marrero and resides in Harvey.
Fats Domino, rock and roll singer and pianist
Girod Jackson III, former state representative for District 87 in Jefferson Parish; contractor in Harvey 
 Patrick O'Neal Kennedy (plaintiff in Kennedy v. Louisiana)
Greg Monroe, NBA player
Laremy Tunsil,  NFL player, currently playing for the Houston Texans.
Ebony Woodruff, Democratic member since 2013 of the Louisiana House of Representatives for District 87, resides in Harvey.

References

Census-designated places in Louisiana
Census-designated places in Jefferson Parish, Louisiana
Census-designated places in New Orleans metropolitan area
Louisiana populated places on the Mississippi River